Horse Shoe Curve is an unincorporated community in Clarke County, Virginia, United States.

References

Unincorporated communities in Clarke County, Virginia
Unincorporated communities in Virginia